State Route 159 (SR-159) is a state highway in west-central Utah that runs from the junction of SR-21 in Garrison to US-6/US-50  to the north near Border by the Nevada border. There are no junctions with any other state highways along SR-159.

Route description

This short highway is mainly used as a cutoff for local Snake Valley residents between Garrison (and SR-21) and the main road in the valley, US-6/50.  Motorists traveling from the south to the east, and vice versa, use the SR-159 cutoff.  The road does "continue" north of US-6/50 as a dirt road, known commonly as the "Gandy Road."  This road travels up Snake Valley toward Gandy, Callao, and eventually to Wendover.

History
The route number "159" was previously used for other roads in the state system, including what is now SR 111 (western Salt Lake Valley) from 1933 to 1945 and the Dividend, Utah road from 1945 to 1969.

The current incarnation of SR-159 was designated in 1979 by the Utah State legislature, and has not been changed since.

Major intersections

See also

 List of state highways in Utah

References

External links

159
 159